The Hong Kong cricket team toured Malaysia in February 2020 to play a five-match Twenty20 International (T20I) series, known as the Interport T20 Series. All the matches were played at the Kinrara Academy Oval, Kuala Lumpur. The series marked the return of the 154-year-old tradition of contests known as 'Interport' matches, a term historically used to refer to matches played between various British settlements in Southeast Asia, such as Hong Kong and Malaysia (and the Malay states that preceded Malaysia). The series was originally scheduled to be played at the Mission Road Ground in Mong Kok, Hong Kong, but was cancelled in early February due to the coronavirus pandemic in China.

Malaysia won the first three matches to give them an unassailable lead in the series. The hosts went on to sweep the series 5–0. Both teams went on to compete in the 2020 ACC Eastern Region T20 tournament (the first stage of qualification for the 2020 Asia Cup) which started a few days after the completion of the series.

Squads

T20I series

1st T20I

2nd T20I

3rd T20I

4th T20I

5th T20I

Notes

References

External links
 Series home at ESPN Cricinfo

2020 in Malaysian cricket
2020 in Hong Kong cricket
Associate international cricket competitions in 2019–20